JDS Natsugumo (DD-117) was the second ship of Minegumo-class destroyers.

Construction and career
Natsugumo was laid down at Uraga Dock Company Uraga Shipyard on 26 June 1967 and launched on 25 July 1968. She was commissioned on 25 April 1969.

The ship was equipped with a domestically produced Type 72 fire control system type 1B on a trial basis.

At around 9:30 pm on March 31, 1978, she came into contact with the submarine JDS Asashio while training at Enshu Nada, about 120 km south of Omaezaki, Shizuoka Prefecture. The periscope of Asashio and the right screw of Natsugumo were partially damaged. At that time, anti-submarine attack training aimed at Asashio was underway in this water area, and Asashio came into contact with Natsugumo at a periscope depth of about 16 meters.

A special renovation work was carried out between December 15, 1981 and June 15, 1982, and the DASH QH-50D on the rear deck was removed and equipped with an ASROC launcher.

On March 27, 1982, the 22nd Escort Corps was reorganized into the 2nd Escort Corps.

In 1984, participated in a practicing voyage to the ocean.

On March 19, 1986, the 22nd Escort Corps was reorganized under the Kure District Force.

On August 1, 1995, the type was changed to a training ship, and the ship registration number was changed to TV-3510. Transferred to Training Squadron 1st Training Squadron.

Removed from the register on March 18, 1999. The total distance was 670,610.4 nautical miles.

Citations

References 

1968 ships
Minegumo-class destroyers
Ships built by Uraga Dock Company